Joanne Elsa Peters (born 11 March 1979) is an Australian former soccer player who last played for the Newcastle Jets in the Australian W-League.

Playing career

Club career
After attending the Australian Institute of Sport and the NSW Institute of Sport Peters was signed by Northern NSW Pride in the Australian Women's National Soccer League. She signed with the New York Power in the Women's United Soccer Association. She later had a stint with Brazilian club Santos, becoming the first Australian woman to play professional football in South America.

Peters last played with the Newcastle Jets in the Australian W-League.

International career
Peters made her debut for Australia in 1996. She played her last international football match in February 2009 in a match against Italy in Canberra. She had played 110 times for the Matildas, scoring 28 times.

International goals

Coaching career
In 2009 Peters was a coach with the Australian under-16 women's national team.

Honours
Australian Women's Footballer of the Year: 2009

References

1979 births
Living people
Australian women's soccer players
Australian Institute of Sport soccer players
Newcastle Jets FC (A-League Women) players
Women's United Soccer Association players
New York Power players
Expatriate women's footballers in Brazil
FIFA Century Club
New South Wales Institute of Sport alumni
Expatriate women's soccer players in the United States
Australian expatriate sportspeople in the United States
1999 FIFA Women's World Cup players
2003 FIFA Women's World Cup players
2007 FIFA Women's World Cup players
Olympic soccer players of Australia
Footballers at the 2004 Summer Olympics
Australia women's international soccer players
People from Newcastle, New South Wales
Women's association football midfielders
Santos FC (women) players
Damallsvenskan players
KIF Örebro DFF players
Sportswomen from New South Wales
Soccer players from New South Wales
Australian expatriate women's soccer players
Expatriate women's footballers in Sweden
Sportspeople from Newcastle, New South Wales
Charlotte Lady Eagles players
USL W-League (1995–2015) players